Pierre Leveille (born 19 February 1962) is a Canadian hurdler. He competed in the men's 400 metres hurdles at the 1984 Summer Olympics.

References

1962 births
Living people
Athletes (track and field) at the 1984 Summer Olympics
Canadian male hurdlers
Olympic track and field athletes of Canada
Athletes (track and field) at the 1986 Commonwealth Games
Commonwealth Games competitors for Canada
Place of birth missing (living people)